Susan Edith Saxe (born January 18, 1949) is an American who is one of only eleven women ever to make the FBI's most wanted list, and one of three women from Brandeis University to do so. She was placed on the list on October 17, 1970, and remained on it until March 27, 1975. 

Saxe describes herself as a "lifelong radical activist, intersectional in outlook since back in the day when we just expressed it as the idea that “everything is connected.”"

Background
A student at Brandeis University, Saxe was one of several young radicals who were placed on the FBI's Most Wanted list in the early 1970s. Along with Katherine Ann Power, Stanley Ray Bond, and ex-convicts William Gilday and Robert Valeri, she escaped from a bank robbery in Brighton, Boston, in which accomplice Gilday shot and killed Boston Police Department officer Walter Schroeder. She and her four accomplices broke into a National Guard Armory in Newburyport, Massachusetts, on Sept. 20, 1970, and stole a pickup truck, blasting caps and 400 rounds of .30-caliber ammunition. Saxe was on the run until 1975 when she was arrested in Philadelphia, after a police officer recognized her from a photo distributed by the FBI the same day. She served seven years in prison. Her trial was one of the early cases for Nancy Gertner, who later became a federal judge. Gertner describes the trial as her "first big case".

Personal life
Saxe is a lesbian. She  is the sister-in-law of Hollywood screenwriter Josh Olson, and has appeared on his podcast series The West Wing Thing.

References

External links
Brainiac

Trivia Library

1949 births
American bank robbers
American female criminals
Brandeis University alumni
FBI Ten Most Wanted Fugitives
Fugitives
Lesbian feminists
Lesbians
Living people
People from Hartford, Connecticut